Yves Marre is a French entrepreneur, inventor and adventurer, co-founder of Friendship (NGO) in Bangladesh, co-founder of NGO Watever in France and creator of TaraTari Shipyard in Bangladesh.

Studies
Marre received a scholarship from the French Air Force at 17 years old. Received the degree of private airplane pilot at the age of 18.

Career

1973 to 1996, career at Air France as cabin crew.
In parallel, he participates in various projects as a pilot and sailor:
 For “Aviation without Borders” NGO: carries out humanitarian missions as co-pilot and logistician in Central Africa and instructor of seaplane in the Colombian Amazon rainforest for a French doctor.
 Flight instructor, micro light pilot, designer and trial pilot of “Propulsar” (motorized paraglider from his invention, with which he flew across the English Channel as a “premiere” from France to England in 1988).
 He sails across the Atlantic Ocean on its river barge, also as a “premiere”, from Paris to Miami in 1990.
 In 1992, assists Gerard Feldzer in his tests of the pedal helium balloon with which Nicolas Hulot and Gerard Feldzer, then Director of the Museum of Air and Space of France, attempted a flight across the Atlantic Ocean.

1993: Initiates the project: "A Hospital Barge for Bangladesh" and creates the first Friendship (NGO), in France. The French government allots Friendship a river barge of 38.5 m through the Companies Fluviale de Transport.

1994: Sails this river barge from France to Bangladesh, also as a “premiere”.

1997: Founds with his wife, Runa Khan Marre, Contic Cruises, a river tourism company. Launches the largest traditional sailing ship in Bangladesh: the “B613”.

1998: Founds with his wife, Runa Khan Marre, Friendship Bangladesh.

2004: Creates TaraTari Shipyard Ltd.

2008: Curator of "Les Voiles anciennes du Bangladesh – Ancient Sails of Bangladesh" an exhibition from Friendship Bangladesh, at the National Maritime Museum of Paris and Brest, and then in 2010 at Port Museum of Douarnenez.

2010: Co-founder of French NGO Watever, with Marc Van Peteghem, creator of the naval architecture agency VPLP, Alain Connan and Gérald Similowski.

2013: Head of Mission for the archeological Department under the Ministry of Culture of Bangladesh for the excavation of an ancient shipwreck on the beach of Kuakata (southern Bangladesh).

2014: Co-founder of the Maritime Security & Rescue Society, the maritime rescue association of Bangladesh, along with Admiral Taher, Admiral KS Hussain and other Directors.

Books
 « Sur le Coffre de l’homme mort », co-author, Elocoquent edition
 « La Paix niche sur l‘Atlantique », Revue Fluvial
 « Navigateur Solidaire », coming soon in 2014

Documentaries
 « Escale au Bangladesh », Thalassa
 « L’Empreinte du Tigre », Ushuaia – Nicolas Hulot
 « Les Héros de la Nature », Vue du Ciel – Yann Arthus-Bertrand

Awards
 2008: Won the first award of French Senate for Representation of France
 2012: Won an award for his actions for France Reputation
 2013: Is bestowed the Bangladeshi passport & citizenship (at the initiative of the Prime Minister)

References

External links 
 Yves Marre's website
 TaraTari Shipyard's website
 NGO Watever's website

French businesspeople
Living people
Year of birth missing (living people)